Ammerån is a river in Jämtland, Sweden. It is a tributary of Indalsälven.

References

Rivers of Jämtland County